V. Dhandayuthapani was an Indian politician . He was a Member of Parliament, representing Vellore in the Lok Sabha the lower house of Indian Parliament as a member of the Indian National Congress (Organisation) from 1977 to 1980.

References

Lok Sabha members from Tamil Nadu
Indian National Congress (Organisation) politicians
Janata Party politicians
1941 births
Living people